The 2010–11 season is the 19th year of football played by Aldershot Town F.C. and their 3rd season back in the Football League.

Season summary
Pre-season:
The squad underwent a considerable reshuffle during the summer, with several key players from Aldershot's successful 2009–10 season leaving to join more prestigious clubs. These included Scott Donnelly to Swansea City and winger Kirk Hudson to League One side Brentford. Manager Kevin Dillon brought in a total of 11 new signings to the club, most notably experienced midfielder Glen Little from Sheffield United and Northampton Town's Luke Guttridge. On the pitch, Aldershot had several promising results in pre-season friendlies, including wins over Championship side Bristol City and League One Colchester. Confidence was high that the club could at least match the previous season's 6th-placed finish, Dillon believing that the new squad could be more competitive in the division.

August: The season started brightly as the Shots went unbeaten in the league throughout August. A goalless draw away at Accrington was followed a week later by a 1–0 home victory over Southend, Marvin Morgan grabbing the winner with 9 minutes remaining. Consecutive 1–1 draws followed away to Shrewsbury and at home to Stevenage, Morgan missing a late penalty in the latter game to deny the Shots all three points. The team also progressed to the second round of the League Trophy, winning 2–0 at home to Oxford United with goals from Danny Hylton and Damian Spencer. The Shots had a less impressive League Cup run, as despite what Dillon saw as a good performance, the team were easily beaten by Watford three goals to nil in the first round.

September: Aldershot continued their early unbeaten run with a third consecutive 1–1 draw at home to Northampton, though the Shots needed a Ben Harding volley in the 5th minute of injury time to salvage a point. The next game - away to promotion-chasing Port Vale - promised to be a tough test, and this was proved right as the club suffered its first loss of the season, Gary Roberts scoring the only goal of the game. On 16 September the management brought in winger Marlon Jackson on loan from Bristol City, a player who assistant manager Gary Owers believed would help the team in the attacking third. Wycombe were the next visitors to the Recreation Ground, which meant a return for former Shots' boss Gary Waddock, who led the club to the Football Conference championship in the 2007–08 season. The match failed to live up to expectations, ending in a dull goalless draw. This fifth low-scoring draw of the season encouraged fears that the side were not good enough up front, and were not converting the few chances being presented to them. The squad responded by taking a 2–0 lead away to Stockport in their next game, only to throw it away in the final minutes to draw yet again. A win did come before the end of the month, however, Morgan again netting in the final ten minutes to snatch all three points away to Torquay.

October: The month started poorly as a 2–0 home reverse against Cheltenham Town was followed days later by the team's elimination from another cup competition, this time losing 1–0 away to Bristol Rovers in the League Trophy. The Shots picked up in form mid-October and recorded their first back-to-back wins of the season against Oxford and Morecambe, with Morgan again on the scoresheet in both fixtures. The results lifted Aldershot into the League Two playoff places for the first and only time in the season. The next game - away to Crewe - would be a landmark for Aldershot Town captain Anthony Charles, the defender picking up his 200th appearance for the club. The match went poorly for Charles as the team lost 3–1, a result which was followed a week later by another defeat by the same scoreline at home to Bury. Both striker Morgan and manager Dillon were sent off, the latter for complaining about the performance of the match officials.

November: Despite manager Dillon believing his side deserved all three points, the Shots were again held to a 2–2 draw away to Hereford in their first game of the month, Jermaine McGlashan picking up his first goal for the club. The FA Cup first round had drawn Aldershot away to League One side Brentford, and the side performed admirably against higher league opposition to earn a replay. The 11 November marked Dillon's first full year in charge of the club, and in an interview he told the media he was pleased with the progression made during his tenure. The side suffered a 2–0 defeat away to Macclesfield before Brentford travelled to Aldershot for the FA Cup replay. In front of an above-average crowd of 3627, Wade Small got the only goal of the game to send the Shots into a second round tie away to Conference South side Dover Athletic. The club continued to struggle in the league, a 2–0 home defeat against table-topping Chesterfield prompted Dillon to bemoan the team's shooting as "terrible" and was quickly followed by the signing of free agent Wesley Ngo Baheng on a short-term contract. The Shots' striking improved in the midweek away game at Burton, Small continuing his good run of form with two more goals. Baheng made his debut for Aldershot in the FA Cup game against Dover, but failed to make an impact as the Shots went down to a disappointing 2–0 defeat against opposition two levels below them on the league pyramid, leaving manager Dillon perplexed.

December: Aldershot only completed one competitive game throughout the month, as heavy snow affected many league fixtures. A missed penalty by Wade Small meant the Shots left Rotherham empty-handed, a single goal from Adam Le Fondre enough to secure all three points for the Millers.

January: The Shots continued their above-average away form with a 2–1 win away at Barnet, but a further home defeat, this time 2–1 at home to relegation-threatened Hereford, caused supporters to voice their displeasure by booing the players off the pitch. Dillon responded by urging fans to be "realistic", while goalkeeper Jamie Young called for fans to get behind the team. The club's woes were compounded by striker Marvin Morgan sparking controversy over his comments on social networking site Twitter, resulting in the player being transfer-listed and quickly moved out on loan to Dagenham & Redbridge. A fourth straight home reverse to Oxford followed, and proved to be Dillon's last game as manager, as he and assistant Gary Owers left by mutual consent on 10 January, the club citing the team's poor league performance as a major contributing factor in the decision. A successor was not long in arriving, as the club officially named Newport County's Dean Holdsworth as new Aldershot manager just two days later. Holdsworth wasted no time making his mark on the team, bringing in forwards Peter Vincenti, Tim Sills, and Alex Rodman - as well as defender Simon Grand on loan from Fleetwood - before the end of the month. There were also players leaving the club during this period of transition, with both Glen Little and Wesley Ngo Baheng being released, whilst Anthony Straker and Damian Spencer were sent out on loan. Holdsworth's first game in charge resulted in a creditable 1–1 draw away to high-flying Bury, and he also improved on Aldershot's poor home form; Winning his first game at The Rec 1–0 against Bradford City, whilst a last-minute Luke Guttridge free-kick gave the Shots a second consecutive home win 3–2 against Crewe. The final game of the month saw Holdsworth's first defeat as Aldershot manager, 2–1 at Gillingham, though positives were taken from Alex Rodman's debut goal for the club.

February: The new manager continued attempting to strengthen the squad throughout February, with loan signings Albert Jarrett and Luke Medley from Lincoln and Mansfield respectively, though neither had a large impact on the team with only a handful of appearances between them. Holdsworth also signed former Shots goalkeeper Mikhael Jaimez-Ruiz, who made 62 appearances in a previous spell at the club. On the pitch, Aldershot went on a run of five consecutive draws, the first away to league leaders Chesterfield who required a later equaliser to rescue a point. An away stalemate at Morecambe was followed by consecutive home draws against Macclesfield and Lincoln. After a further draw against Northampton the Shots were finally beaten by a strong Port Vale side pushing for promotion, though the result could have been different if Anthony Charles hadn't missed a penalty. Aldershot ended the month in 18th position in the league, 8 points clear of the relegation zone.

March: Dean Holdsworth's men went unbeaten throughout March to virtually ensure the club's survival in League Two. Draws at home to Gillingham and away to Wycombe were followed by Aldershot's first win for nine games, a 1–0 home victory over Torquay, Luke Guttridge with the winner. The Shots pushed on from this positive result, recording three straight wins against teams in poor form, away to Cheltenham and at home to Barnet and Stockport. This run lifted the club to 14th in the table and a comfortable 17 points off the relegation zone. The upturn in form prompted speculation that the team could mount a charge for the playoffs, and though the club could only draw in their final game of the month at home to Accrington, Aldershot were left only 7 points behind 7th placed Rotherham. March also saw defender Jamie Vincent released from the club after not featuring in Holdsworth's first team plans, as well as a first team opportunity for youth team winger Adam Mekki.

April: The shots continued their unbeaten run into the first half of April, with a goalless away draw at Southend being followed by a convincing 3–0 home success over Shrewsbury, a team in good form chasing an automatic promotion place. A similarly impressive result followed as the Shots got a creditable draw away to Stevenage, Alex Rodman with two well-taken goals. The team's unbeaten run finally came to an end at home to Burton - the Shots going down 2–1 to suffer their first defeat in ten league games  - and it seemed that the teams' minds were already on their holiday plans as they suffered a consecutive 2–1 defeat away to Bradford. The players stopped the rot in the penultimate game of the season, but still threw away a two-goal lead to draw with Rotherham. In the final league game of the season, Aldershot won 3–0 in Lincoln, relegated Lincoln. Luke Guttridge scored 2 goals and ended as the club's top scorer. The club followed up the previous month's signing of Adam Mekki by handing professional contracts to youth players Doug Bergqvist and Henrik Breimyr.

Squad

Note: Players listed in italics left the club before the end of the season.
Note: Unused youth team substitutes not listed

Transfers

In

Out

Loans

Results

League Two

Results summary

Results by round

Matches

FA Cup

League Cup

Football League Trophy

Season statistics

Squad stats

|-
!colspan="21"|Players who left the club before the end of the season
|-

|}

Note: Hampshire Senior Cup games and statistics not included.

Discipline

Statistics accurate as of match played 25 April 2011

Awards

References 
General
Aldershot Town F.C. Official Website
BBC Sport
Soccerbase

Specific

Aldershot Town F.C. seasons
Aldershot Town